Black Eyed Bruiser is a single by Australian blues/hard rock band Rose Tattoo. It's the lead single from the band's seventh studio album, Blood Brothers.

Track listing 
 "Black Eyed Bruiser" (Stevie Wright Cover)
 "Rock n Roll Outlaw"*
 "Remedy"*
 "Astra Wally"*

Personal 
 Angry Anderson - Vocals
 Mick Cocks - Guitar
 Dai Prichard - Slide Guitar
 Steve King - Bass
 Paul DeMarco - Drums
 Rob Riley (*) - Slide Guitar

External links

2006 singles